Teresa Taylor (born November 10, 1962), also known as Teresa Nervosa, is an American musician and actress. She is best known as being a drummer for the American punk band Butthole Surfers.

Biography
Taylor was born in Arlington, Texas. She began drumming by playing for various high school marching bands in Texas' Fort Worth and Austin areas. King Coffey, another Surfers drummer who remains with the group to this day, was one of her fellow performers in high school.

Taylor was one of two Surfers drummers from 1983 through 1989 (the other being Coffey), with the exception of a brief leave of absence from late 1985 to 1986. In that band, she and Coffey would drum in unison on separate, stand-up drum kits. Her drumming can be heard on a number of key Surfers albums, including Psychic... Powerless... Another Man's Sac, Rembrandt Pussyhorse, Locust Abortion Technician, and many others (see "Discography" section).

Shortly after leaving the band in 1989, Taylor was diagnosed with an aneurysm and subsequently underwent brain surgery. She also started to suffer from strobe light-induced seizures.

Taylor had a small role in director Richard Linklater's 1991 film, Slacker. She played a woman who was trying to sell a pap smear from Madonna. Taylor's character, listed as "Pap smear Pusher", also appeared on the movie's poster and subsequent home video media covers.

In 1995, Coffey indicated that Taylor was employed at the Texas School for the Blind and Visually Impaired, and was working on a book about her experiences touring with the Butthole Surfers.

As of 2007, Taylor was living in Austin and still recording music with Gibby Haynes, who has a home studio there. In 2008, she returned to the Butthole Surfers: the band's website announced tour dates for 2009 including Taylor.

In November 2021, Taylor announced via a public Facebook post that she had been diagnosed with end-stage lung disease. In another post a year later, she described her death as "imminent," further noting that she had "received a loving message from Paul and spoke on the phone with King and Gibby.  It's all been a blast....Ciao."

Family confusion
During her time with the Butthole Surfers, Taylor and Coffey repeatedly referred to themselves, and were referred to, as siblings. However, in his 2001 book on the American punk movement, Our Band Could Be Your Life, author Michael Azerrad asserts that the two only presented themselves as brother and sister due to their similar appearances, and were not actually related.

Discography
All albums and EPs released by the Butthole Surfers.

1984 Live PCPPEP
1984 Psychic... Powerless... Another Man's Sac
1985 Cream Corn from the Socket of Davis
1986 Rembrandt Pussyhorse
1987 Locust Abortion Technician
1988 Hairway to Steven
1989 Double Live (Butthole Surfers album)
1995 The Hole Truth... and Nothing Butt
2002 Humpty Dumpty LSD
2003 Butthole Surfers/Live PCPPEP

Filmography
1988 Bar-B-Que Movie
1991 Slacker

References

1962 births
Living people
Butthole Surfers members
American rock drummers
American women drummers
20th-century American drummers
20th-century American women musicians